Anne Deniau, known as Ann Ray, (born 1969) is a French visual artist. 

Ann Ray has published several photographic books: Nicolas Le Riche (2008), Mira Me (2009), 24 hours in a Man's Life (2011), Love Looks Not With the Eyes (2012)—13 years of work with Lee Alexander McQueen, and Les Inachevés (2018).

Early life and education

Ray was born in Brest, France, in 1969. She is self-taught in photography except for alternative processes which she studied during her studies at Central Saint Martins in London. In the 1990s, she decided to follow a career as a photographer and artist. In 1995 she moved to Tokyo and in 1996 she started her photographic career.

Work
Ray is a photographer, artist and filmmaker.

In Tokyo, she first worked for Givenchy and Cartier. Her photographs were published in Japanese magazines such as Hi-Fashion, She, Marie-Claire, Spur, The Seine. For three months she has observed textile art in Japan, in Tokyo and Kyoto. She photographed and interviewed artisans throughout Japan.

During her London years, she forged an unbreakable relationship with Lee Alexander McQueen. This was the start of an intense friendship and artistic collaboration that was as prolific as it was unique. He gave her carte blanche on the basis of a simple agreement between friends. From 1997 until the designer's death in 2010, Ann Ray's caring gaze captured the spirit of the man and the essence of his work, in many intimate situations: portrait sessions, at work in the studio, during performances – images of truth that reveal McQueen's creativity. .

In 2001, she moved to Paris.

In 2003 Ray began working for the Paris Opera, producing posters, rehearsal photos, portraits, for the programmes and the magazine of the Paris Opera, entitled "Line 8" and then "On stage". She created a series of portraits of the Paris Opera Dancers for an exhibition at the Palais Garnier : Double Jeu, exhibited from 2006 to 2008, then revised and expanded from 2009 to 2012.

For more than ten years, she has collaborated with different artists and with other institutions, including the Metropolitan Opera of New York since 2006 (for which she worked on the poster for The Tempest and in 2014 Le nozze di Figaro and Cavalliera Rusticana / Pagliacci ), the Munich Opera and the Salle Pleyel in Paris.

She was signed as a photographer for the DVDs of Giselle (Paris Opera), Siddharta (Paris Opera), La Didone de Cavalli, and The Firebird  / The Rite of Spring directed by Paavo Jarvi .

One of her portraits was used by Michael Nyman for his CD The Piano sings (II) in 2013.

Filmmaking and writing are also among her tools of expression. She is currently working on a creative documentary, a fiction movie and is preparing the publication of a collection of poems and images, as well as her first novel.

Publications
Jacques Durand, MIRA ME!. Paris: Atlantica
Nicholas Le Riche. Paris: Gourcuff Gradenigo, 2008
24 hours in a man's life. Paris: Anyway, 2011
Love looks not with the eyes: 13 years with Alexander McQueen. Abrams, 2012.
La Source with Christian Lacroix. Actes Sud, 2012.
Loves is with the eyes, Lee Alexander McQueen, Paris, Martiniere, 2012
Les Inachevés, The Unfinished, Lee McQueen, Paris: ArtCinema, 2018.

Exhibitions
2001 Radical Fashion, Victoria & Albert Museum
2006 Double Game, Paris Opera
2008 Nicholas Le Riche
2018 The unfinished-Lee Mcqueen, Arles 2018 meetings, July–September 2018
2019 Blind Faith, Ca'Pesaro International Gallery of Modern Art, Venice April–June 2019
2019 Ann Ray & Lee McQueen: Rendez-vous, Barrett Barrera Projects, St Louis

Filmography

In 2006, Ray directed a film about Caligula, by Nicolas Le Riche for the Paris Opera. Also in 2006, she directed a film about Amoveo, by Benjamin Millepied, the New York City Ballet's star dancer.

In 2007, she directed a film about "Rare Differences", created by Marie-Agnès Gillot, the Paris Opera's star dancer. The film included dancers Julie Guibert and Marjorie Hannoteaux. The same year, she directed a film about Les âmes frères by Julien Lestel at Espace Cardin.

In 2010 and 2011, she produced and directed a film with Stéphane Bullion, for which the music was written by Michael Nyman. The film was part of the project "24 Hours in the Life of a Man".

Short filmography : 
2011 24 hours in a Man's Life, art film premiere at the Opera de la Bastille
2014 Metamorphosis, short film with Aurélie Dupont & Jeremie Belingard, FIT, NY
2016 I love Writing for People I love. Film about composer Nico Muhly, Opéra de Paris
Conversations, 2 short films about William Forsythe & Merce Cunningham, Opéra de Paris

References

French women photographers
Artists from Brest, France
Year of birth unknown
1969 births
Living people